The Mascarene white-eye has been split into the following species:
 Réunion grey white-eye, Zosterops borbonicus
 Mauritius grey white-eye, Zosterops mauritianus

Animal common name disambiguation pages